Made in America is a 2013 American documentary film directed by Ron Howard, about the music festival of the same name founded by Jay-Z. It was screened in the Mavericks section at the 2013 Toronto International Film Festival. Howard said the festival documentary will be "a reflection of the fabric of what it means to be 'Made in America'—what the festival represents, why Jay is doing it and how he relates to each artist." The documentary features performances from  Pearl Jam, Odd Future, Dirty Projectors, Skrillex, Santigold, Janelle Monáe, and Run-DMC.

References

External links
 

2013 documentary films
2013 films
American documentary films
American music
Documentary films about music festivals
Documentary films about Philadelphia
Films directed by Ron Howard
Films shot in Philadelphia
Jay-Z
Imagine Entertainment films
2010s English-language films
2010s American films